Škoda Motorsport is the division of Czech car manufacturer Škoda Auto responsible for motorsport activities. The division had competed as a manufacturer in the World Rally Championship between 1999 and 2005; and Intercontinental Rally Challenge (before it merged with ERC in 2013). It also competed in the European Rally Championship and WRC2 and won the inaugural WRC2 Pro category in 2019. Since 2020, Škoda have not entered any championships but do provide support and parts to teams on event, including supporting the Toksport WRT teams in WRC2 and ERC with technical support.

Škoda Motorsport drivers have won the 2012–2014 ERC series with the Škoda Fabia S2000, Škoda Motorsport was also the most successful manufacturer in IRC 2010–2012 and in WRC-2 2015–2018 with Škoda Fabia R5.

History

The Škoda brand has been engaged in motor sport since 1901, and has gained a number of titles with various vehicles around the world. The sports car Škoda 966 Supersport raced both among sports cars and racing cars. It won second place at the Czechoslovak Grand Prix 1950, it was first next year in Liberec and in 1953 it achieved a Czechoslovak road speed record of 197.8 km/h. Its successor, the Škoda 1100 OHC (type 968), won at its premiere the first prize in Mladá Boleslav. The car in the socialist countries won in the first season all the races it took part in, except for the Budapest race where it took the third place.

1960s–1998
Škoda began rallying in the 1960s with the Octavia and 1000MB models, before progressing on to the 110, 120 and 130 series.  Most of these were fairly lightly modified versions of the production cars, and with their small engines they competed in the lower power classes. 

On two occasions Škoda did produce more specialised rally cars.  The first of these was the Group4 130 RS, which was introduced in 1976 and continued to compete until 1983.  The second was the Group B 130 LR in 1985-6.  Both cars took advantage of the freedoms allowed by the Group 4 and Group B regulations to run with considerably more powerful engines and lighter bodywork than standard, and in the case of the 130 RS much wider wheelarches as well, among other improvements on the standard cars.

Škoda Motorsport, a small outfit by works rally team standards, was at the time run as a department of the main Škoda factory. Among the staff there, working on the rally team was regarded as a highly desirable job, and even many of the drivers were selected from among company staff, although foreign professionals did drive for the team as well.  Most notable among these was the Norwegian John Haugland, who appeared for the team on European and World Rallies in the 1970s and 1980s.

Alongside western cars in the same classes, the Škodas were increasingly dated in technological terms.  However, they were very reliable, the team was experienced and many of the works drivers were very talented.  Consequently, Škoda Motorsport was very successful, especially on long rallies where reliability mattered.  Škodas frequently won their classes on world events, and were notably successful on the RAC Rally in Great Britain, in which they took the under-1300cc trophy for seventeen years running.  They also scored some high placings overall, among them eighth on the Acropolis Rally in 1973 and 1979, and sixth in San Remo, in 1986.  On European Championship events they frequently finished in the top ten, and on events behind the Iron Curtain they were often contenders for outright victory, although against relatively limited opposition.

The rear-engined cars were finally pensioned off in 1989, in favour of the new, front-drive  model, which the team used until 1994.  Like its predecessors it was sturdy but, with its 1300cc, 110 bhp engine, fairly slow.  It continued the team's record of class and category wins, and the introduction for the ‘Formula 2’ category to world rallying in 1993 gave it a chance to chase bigger prizes.  Škoda won the Formula 2 World Championship outright in 1994.  Škoda was the only works team to contest the entire championship, but equally, on most events it was up against far more advanced and faster cars with a degree of works support, such as the Opel Astra and Nissan Sunny.  Drivers Pavel Sibera and Emil Triner finished ninth and tenth overall on that year's Acropolis Rally.

The introduction of the ‘Kit Car’ rules in 1995 gave Škoda the opportunity to produce a more specialist car, the Škoda Felicia Kit Car. It did, however, score a remarkable result on the 1996 RAC Rally, coming third overall in the hands of veteran driver Stig Blomqvist, a reflection of how well the little car handled in that year's icy conditions.

The Felicia was replaced in 1998 by a Formula 2 version of the Octavia, with a two-litre engine and front-wheel-drive.  However, by then the team was preparing the full, four-wheel-drive WRC version of the Octavia and the F2 version contested only a few events.

Since 1998

Škoda entered the World Rally Championship at the top level for the first time in 1999, with the Škoda Octavia WRC, competing on seven of the 14 events. Armin Schwarz drove one car and the second car was shared by Czech drivers Pavel Sibera and Emil Triner for most of the season, with Bruno Thiry driving the second car on the final event of the season, Rally GB, where he finished fourth, the team's first points finish.

For 2000, the team competed in eight of the 14 rallies, with Schwarz being joined in the team by Spaniard Luís Climent. Schwarz scored the team's only points finish of the year with a fifth on the Acropolis Rally. An Evo2 version of the Octavia WRC was introduced in Cyprus. For 2001, Thiry joined the team full-time in place of Climent, as the team took on 12 of the year's 14 rallies. Schwarz scored points on three occasions, including a third-place finish on the Safari Rally, the team's best result to date. The team also entered a third car for Stig Blomqvist in Finland and for Roman Kresta in San Remo and Rally GB.

For 2002, where the team would compete on every event, Schwarz left the team for fellow-strugglers Hyundai. Kenneth Eriksson moved in the other direction to replace him, while Toni Gardemeister replaced Thiry. A third car was entered for Kresta on most events, with Blomqvist, Gabriel Pozzo and Matthias Kahle also driving the car. Gardemeister finished fifth in Argentina, with Eriksson in sixth, while Gardemeister also finished sixth in Australia. The Octavia WRC Evo3 was introduced mid-season. Škoda brought in former World Champion Didier Auriol to drive alongside Gardemeister in 2003. Both drivers scored points in the first-half of the season, when the Fabia WRC was introduced.

Škoda used 2004 as a development year, and hence only entered seven rallies. Schwarz returned to the team to partner Gardemeister, with Jani Paasonen driving a third car in Finland and Great Britain, Kresta in Germany and Jan Kopecký in Spain. Paasonen finished sixth in Finland, the team's best result of the year.

For 2005, Škoda used a wide range of drivers. Schwarz drove one car on all but one event, with touring car driver Mattias Ekström driving it in Sweden. The second car was shared by Alexandre Bengué (on tarmac events), Janne Tuohino, Jani Paasonen, Colin McRae and Mikko Hirvonen. A third car was entered on six rounds and shared by Tuohino, Paasonen and Kopecký. A new version of the Fabia, the WRC05, was introduced at the third round in Mexico. Once again, the team would only score points on a handful of occasions, although McRae showed promise in his two events, running third in Australia when mechanical failure hit.

Škoda withdrew from the WRC at the end of 2005. For 2006, a privateer Škoda team would be run by Baumschlager Rallye & Racing under the name Red Bull Škoda Team, with a Škoda Fabia WRC driven by Gilles Panizzi. Kopecký continued to score strong results in a privately entered car run by Czech Rally Team Kopecký. François Duval also raced in season 2006 with Škoda Fabia WRC for First Motorsport.

In Rally Norway 2009, Per-Gunnar Andersson entered Škoda Fabia WRC, won 2 Special Stages but retired after problems with the clutch.

It was announced that 2010 IRC champion Juho Hänninen and Herrman Gassner Jr. were going to race in SWRC 2011 in a semi-factory team run again by Baumschlager Rallye & Racing with support of Red Bull and Škoda. The name of the team was Red Bull Škoda. They appeared in 7 selected WRC events. Since the next year, the name was however changed to Red Bull Team. Škoda Motorsport team raced both years also independently.

Intercontinental Rally Challenge

Škoda Motorsport returned to rallying in 2008 with a new Super 2000 version of the Fabia, to be entered in the Intercontinental Rally Challenge Jan Kopecký showed Fabia at Barum Rally Zlín 2008 for the first time when he was driving it as pre-racer. Jan Kopecký and Juho Hänninen were signed as drivers for season 2009. Hänninen took the car's first win on Rally Russia, with Kopecký winning in the Czech Republic and Spain on his way to second in the standings.

In the 2010 season, Škoda Motorsport achieved seven wins, nine 2nd and 3rd places, taking the manufacturers championship after the Barum Rally Zlín. Juho Hänninen achieved the drivers title and also won Rally Argentina, Rally Sardegna and Rally Scotland.

For 2011 season opening rally, famous Rallye Monte Carlo Škoda entered 5 cars. Jan Kopecký, Juho Hänninen, Freddy Loix and Nicolas Vouilloz were entered for Škoda Motorsport and Andreas Mikkelsen for Škoda UK. Mikkelsen crashed into wall at 1st special stage and had to retire at 2nd special stage because of suspension problems after crash. Vouilloz had a puncture at 1st special stage and lost some time. Hänninen was leading after first leg 44.5s before Freddy Loix, Kopecký was 6th and Vouilloz was 12th. The second leg of the rally was unlucky for Škoda because drivers had chosen wrong tyres at the service before stages 7 and 8 so they lost a lot of time and Hänninen lost the lead and was 6th 2:35.7s after new leader Bryan Bouffier. Freddy Loix dropped from 2nd place to 3rd, 1:05.5s after Bouffier, Vouilloz finished 8th and Kopecký 9th. At the end of the rally Loix achieved 2nd place, Hänninen 6 th, Vouilloz 7th and Kopecký 8th. It was disappointing rally for Škoda because Hänninen was fast enough to win and only wrong tyre choice for 2 special stages cost him win, at least he won the Colin McRae IRC Trophy.

Until the final season of IRC in 2012, Škoda Motorsport was the most successful manufacturer with a total of 27 points, winning the rallying series in 2010–2012. Since 2013, when the two competing series were merged, it continued to compete in the European Rally Championship.

WRC results

The team had competed as a manufacturer in the World Rally Championship between 1999 and 2005. Škoda Motorsport won the WRC-2 with the Škoda Fabia R5 in 2015–2018.

ERC results

Škoda Motorsport drivers won with Škoda Fabia S2000 the European Rally Championships in 2012–2014.

APRC results

Major Championship Victories

References

External links

 Škoda Motorsport
 Result database of ŠKODA Fabia R5: http://fabiar5.cz/en 
 Result database of ŠKODA Fabia S2000: http://fabias2000.cz/en

World Rally Championship teams
Czech auto racing teams
Motorsport
Official motorsports and performance division of automakers
Red Bull sports teams
Intercontinental Rally Challenge teams
European Rally Championship teams